Ángel Viñas Martín (born 1941) is a Spanish economist and historian. He has published many works dealing with the Spanish Civil War focusing on the war finance as well as the international relations aspects of the conflict.

Biography 
Born in Madrid in 1941. He joined the Corps of Spanish State Economists and Trade Experts in 1968. He worked as adviser of the Foreign Minister Fernando Morán.

He has been professor of Applied Economics at the University of Valencia, the University of Alcalá, the National University of Distance Education and the Complutense University of Madrid.

Decorations 

 Grand Cross of the Order of Civil Merit (2010)

Works 

Author
 
 
 
 
 
 
 
 
 
 
 
 
 
 
 
 
 
 

 Co-author

References 

Living people
1941 births
20th-century Spanish historians
Spanish economists
Academics and writers on the international relations of Spain
Historians of the Spanish Civil War
Grand Cross of the Order of Civil Merit
Historians of Francoist Spain
Writers from Madrid
21st-century Spanish historians